The 1988 NCAA Division I men's basketball tournament involved 64 schools playing in single-elimination play to determine the national champion of men's  NCAA Division I college basketball. The 50th annual edition of the tournament began on March 17, 1988, and ended with the championship game on April 4 returning to Kansas City for the 10th time. A total of 63 games were played.

Kansas, coached by Larry Brown, won the national title with an 83–79 victory in the final game over Big Eight Conference rival Oklahoma, coached by Billy Tubbs. As of 2022, this was the last national championship game to feature two schools from the same conference.  Danny Manning of Kansas was named the tournament's Most Outstanding Player. Even though the Final Four was contested  from its campus in Lawrence, Kansas, Kansas was considered a long shot against the top rated Sooners because Oklahoma had previously defeated the Jayhawks twice by 8 points that season—at home in Norman, Oklahoma and on the road in Kansas' Allen Fieldhouse. Kansas's upset was the third biggest point-spread upset in Championship Game history.  After this upset, the 1988 Kansas team was remembered as "Danny and the Miracles."

This was the first NCAA Tournament which barred teams from playing on their home courts, or in any facility in which it played four or more regular season games. The NCAA Division I Men's Basketball Committee made this change after each of the previous two Final Fours featured a team which played its first and second round games at home: LSU in 1986 (as a No. 11 seed) and Syracuse in 1987.  

The team which was arguably hurt the most by the change was North Carolina, whose Dean Smith Center hosted for the first (and as of 2022, only) time. The Tar Heels were a No. 2 seed, but with the hosting ban now in effect, they were shipped to the West, where they were routed in the regional final by top seed Arizona. Archrival Duke was the No. 2 seed in the East and won its first two games at Chapel Hill on its way to the Final Four.

Schedule and venues

The following are the sites that were selected to host each round of the 1988 tournament:

First and Second Rounds
March 17 and 19
East Region
 Dean Smith Center, Chapel Hill, North Carolina (Host: University of North Carolina at Chapel Hill)
Midwest Region
 Edmund P. Joyce Center, South Bend, Indiana (Host: University of Notre Dame)
Southeast Region
 Omni Coliseum, Atlanta, Georgia (Host: Georgia Institute of Technology)
West Region
 Jon M. Huntsman Center, Salt Lake City, Utah (Host: University of Utah)
March 18 and 20
East Region
 Hartford Civic Center, Hartford, Connecticut (Host: University of Connecticut)
Midwest Region
 Bob Devaney Sports Center, Lincoln, Nebraska (Host: University of Nebraska-Lincoln)
Southeast Region
 Riverfront Coliseum, Cincinnati, Ohio (Hosts: University of Cincinnati, Xavier University)
West Region
 Pauley Pavilion, Los Angeles, California (Host: UCLA)

Regional semifinals and finals (Sweet Sixteen and Elite Eight)
March 24 and 26
East Regional, Brendan Byrne Arena, East Rutherford, New Jersey (Hosts: Seton Hall University, Big East Conference)
Southeast Regional, BJCC Coliseum, Birmingham, Alabama (Host: Southeastern Conference)
March 25 and 27
Midwest Regional, Pontiac Silverdome, Pontiac, Michigan (Hosts: University of Detroit Mercy, Midwestern Collegiate Conference)
West Regional, Kingdome, Seattle, Washington (Host: University of Washington)

National semifinals and championship (Final Four and championship)
April 2 and 4
Kemper Arena, Kansas City, Missouri (Host: Big 8 Conference)

Kansas City returned as Final Four host for the first time since 1964, with Kemper Arena becoming the 25th arena to host it. 1988 saw two new host locations, in Chapel Hill, part of the Raleigh-Durham metropolitan area, and Pontiac, in suburban Detroit, which had never hosted games beforehand. The Silverdome became the seventh domed stadium to host tournament games. This would be the only appearance in the tournament for the Dean Smith Center, and would also be the last year hosting for Pauley Pavilion, the Joyce Center and Bob Devaney Sports Center (all tournament games in Nebraska since 1988 have been played at CHI Health Center Omaha; if the tournament ever returns to Lincoln, games would be played at Pinnacle Bank Arena.

Teams

(#) Kentucky was later stripped of its two NCAA tournament wins due to an ineligible player.

Bracket
* – Denotes overtime period

East Regional – East Rutherford, New Jersey

Midwest Regional – Pontiac, Michigan

Southeast Regional – Birmingham, Alabama

(#) Kentucky was later stripped of its two NCAA tournament wins due to an ineligible player.

West Regional – Seattle, Washington

Final Four – Kansas City, Missouri

Game summaries

Announcers

Television
CBS Sports
Jim Nantz & James Brown served as studio hosts.
Brent Musburger and Billy Packer – First round (Florida–St. John's) at Salt Lake City, Utah; Second Round at Hartford, Connecticut and Chapel Hill, North Carolina; West Regional at Seattle, Washington; Final Four at Kansas City, Missouri
Tim Brant and Bill Raftery – First (UNLV–SW Missouri State) and Second Rounds at Los Angeles, California; East Regional at East Rutherford, New Jersey
Dick Stockton and Billy Cunningham – Second Round at Lincoln, Nebraska and Salt Lake City, Utah; Southeast Regional at Birmingham, Alabama
Verne Lundquist and Tom Heinsohn – Second Round at Cincinnati, Ohio and South Bend, Indiana; Midwest Regional at Pontiac, Michigan
Tim Ryan and Curry Kirkpatrick – Second Round at Atlanta, Georgia
ESPN and NCAA Productions
John Saunders (NCAA Tournament Today) and Bob Ley (NCAA Tournament Tonight) served as studio hosts and Dick Vitale served as studio analyst.
Mike Gorman and Ron Perry – First round (Temple–Lehigh, Georgia Tech–Iowa State) at Hartford, Connecticut
Bob Carpenter and Dan Belluomini – First round (Indiana–Richmond, Georgetown–LSU) at Hartford, Connecticut
Ralph Hacker and Bucky Waters – First round (Duke–Boston University, Missouri–Rhode Island) at Chapel Hill, North Carolina
Bob Rathbun and Dan Bonner – First round (Syracuse–North Carolina A&T, SMU–Notre Dame) at Chapel Hill, North Carolina
Fred White and Larry Conley – First round (Oklahoma–Chattanooga, Louisville–Oregon State) at Atlanta, Georgia
Mike Patrick and Bob Ortegel – First round (Brigham Young–Charlotte, Auburn–Bradley) at Atlanta, Georgia
Tom Hammond and Mike Pratt – First round (Kentucky–Southern, Illinois–UTSA) at Cincinnati, Ohio
Mick Hubert and Jack Givens – First round (Villanova–Arkansas, Maryland–UC Santa Barbara) at Cincinnati, Ohio
Eddie Doucette and John Laskowski – First round (Purdue–Fairleigh Dickinson, Kansas State–La Salle) at South Bend, Indiana
Wayne Larrivee and Jim Gibbons – First round (DePaul–Wichita State, Baylor–Memphis State) at South Bend, Indiana
Ron Franklin and Quinn Buckner – First round (Pittsburgh–Eastern Michigan, N.C. State–Murray State) at Lincoln, Nebraska
John Sanders and Gary Thompson – First round (Kansas–Xavier, Vanderbilt–Utah State) at Lincoln, Nebraska
Pete Solomon and Derrek Dickey – First round (Arizona–Cornell) at Los Angeles, California
Phil Stone and Lynn Shackelford – First round (Iowa–Florida State, Seton Hall–UTEP) at Los Angeles, California
Ted Robinson and Bruce Larson – First round (North Carolina–North Texas) at Salt Lake City, Utah
Frank Fallon and Bruce Larson – First round (Michigan–Boise State) at Salt Lake City, Utah
Frank Fallon and Irv Brown – First round (Wyoming–Loyola Marymount) at Salt Lake City, Utah

See also
 1988 NCAA Division II men's basketball tournament
 1988 NCAA Division III men's basketball tournament
 1988 NCAA Division I women's basketball tournament
 1988 NCAA Division II women's basketball tournament
 1988 NCAA Division III women's basketball tournament
 1988 National Invitation Tournament
 1988 National Women's Invitation Tournament
 1988 NAIA Division I men's basketball tournament
 1988 NAIA Division I women's basketball tournament

NCAA Division I men's basketball tournament
Tournament
NCAA Division I men's basketball tournament
NCAA Division I men's basketball tournament
NCAA Division I men's basketball tournament